Polychalca punctatissima is a species of tortoise beetles belonging to the family Chrysomelidae.

Description
These beetles feed on Black Sage (Cordia cylindrostachya, Boraginaceae).

Distribution
This species can be found in Brazil and Argentina.

References
 Biolib
 Biol.uni.wroc.pl

Cassidinae
Beetles described in 1818